Taco Maker is a Mexican fast food franchise founded in Puerto Rico by Gil L. Craig in 1968. The majority of the stores are in Puerto Rico with one location in Florida (in Orlando) and another in Caracas, Venezuela and, formerly, in St. Thomas, United States Virgin Islands, India, Russia, Dominican Republic,and the Philippines. Taco Maker used to own two franchise locations in the American state of Rhode Island. In 2006, FransGlobal bought the restaurant chain, along with its sister chains Jake's Over the Top and Mayan Jamma Juice. In 2009, Taco Maker moved its headquarters to Central Florida but as of 2019, its website states its headquarters are in San Juan, Puerto Rico.

References

External links 
  
  

Fast-food franchises
Fast-food Mexican restaurants
Fast-food chains of the United States
Regional restaurant chains in the United States
Restaurants in Puerto Rico
1968 establishments in Puerto Rico
Restaurants established in 1968
Puerto Rican brands